General Staff of the Armed Forces of the Islamic Republic of Iran is the most senior military body in Iran, to implement policy, monitor and coordinate activities within the Armed Forces.

Iran's two existing separate militaries, the Islamic Republic of Iran Army (Arteš) and the Islamic Revolutionary Guard Corps (Sepāh) are formally subordinate to the general staff, as well as Iran's sole national police force, the Law Enforcement Force.

The organization was set up in 1989 to enhance cooperation and counterbalance the rivalry between the armed forces and is directly decreed by Supreme Leader of Iran, while the Ministry of Defence and Armed Forces Logistics, responsible for planning, logistics and funding of the armed forces is part of the executive branch under President of Iran.

List of Chiefs

|-
| colspan="9" align="center"| Chief of the Headquarters of the General Command of Forces

|-
| colspan="9" align="center"| Chief of the General Staff of the Armed Forces

See also 

 Joint Staff of the Islamic Revolutionary Guard Corps
 Joint Staff of the Islamic Republic of Iran Army

References

Iran
Military of Iran
1988 establishments in Iran
Military units and formations established in 1988
Armed Forces of the Islamic Republic of Iran
General Staff of the Armed Forces of the Islamic Republic of Iran